Virginie Razzano was the defending champion, but chose not to participate that year.

First-seeded Caroline Wozniacki won in the final 6–2, 3–6, 6–1, against fifth-seeded Kaia Kanepi.

Seeds

Draw

Finals

Top half

Bottom half

External links
 WTA tournament draws

2008 Japan Open Tennis Championships